Hawaiian Electric Industries, Inc. (HEI) is the largest supplier of electricity in the state of Hawaii, supplying power to 95% of Hawaii's population through its electric utilities: Hawaiian Electric Company, Inc., Hawai'i Electric Light Company, Inc. and Maui Electric Company, Limited. In addition, HEI owns a financial institution serving Hawaii, American Savings Bank, and a clean energy and sustainability company, Pacific Current LLC.

HECO, HELCO, and MECO employ more than 2,000 people. Approximately 20,000 Hawaii residents are shareholders of HECO’s parent company, Hawaiian Electric Industries. The company is headquartered in Honolulu. Net income was $219 million on sales of $2.874B for 2019.

The island of Kauai is the only Hawaiian island not supplied by HEI. Instead, the consumer-owned Kauai Island Utility Cooperative manages that island's electricity.

History
Hawaiian Electric Company (often abbreviated HECO, pronounced HEE-coh) incorporated on October 13, 1891. Within about 16 years the utility had 2,500 customers on Oahu. By 1914 HECO had started rural service to the windward side of the island and was marketing electric products like refrigerators and flat irons. In 1937 HECO broke ground on its second power plant, and transmission lines soon crisscrossed Oahu.

War and statehood
During World War II HECO power plants linked to military bases, generating more than one million kilowatt hours of electricity each day. (= > 42 MW average power)

Hawaii became a state in 1959, and by then Oahu was entirely electrified. HECO opened a 116 MW plant in downtown Honolulu in 1954. The state's first reheat steam turbine generator went on line at Kahe on the west coast of Oahu. Today, Kahe is the state's largest plant with a total generating capacity of 650 MW.

Island expansion
HECO purchased Maui Electric Company (abbreviated MECO and pronounced MEE-coh) in 1968. In 1970, HECO acquired the Hawaii Island's Hilo Electric Light Company (later renamed Hawai'i Electric Light Company, abbreviated HELCO and pronounced HEL-coh). In 1988 MECO  acquired the Lanai City power plant on the island of Lana'i, and in 1989, Molokai Electric Company on the island of Moloka'i. Hawaiian Electric Industries, Inc. (HEI) was created as a holding company for these various utilities in 1983. In 2013, HECO began working with Siemens to develop a self-healing grid in eastern Oahu and Waikiki to ensure a reliable electrical supply.

On December 4, 2014, NextEra Energy tendered an offer to purchase HEI for $4.3 billion. The sale required approval by the Hawaii Public Utilities Commission. On July 18, 2016, it was announced that the merger was cancelled after the Public Utilities Commission disapproved the deal. The merger included plans to convert HEI's oil-fired generating plants to run on natural gas, which were to use liquified natural gas imported from a British Columbia plant of FortisBC. The upgrades were cancelled as they were dependent upon approval of the merger.

On December 24, 2019, HECO announced that it would begin operating under a single name with its subsidiaries MECO and HELCO—Hawaiian Electric.

Generation
In 2016 HECO produced 8.8 TWh, of which 2.3 TWh were renewable. Most of the power came from oil, using 8.5 million barrels in 2016, down from 10.7 million barrels in 2008.

Hawaiian Electric supports the adoption of electric vehicles. The company's goal is to have the majority of vehicles in Hawaii be electric vehicles by 2045. As of November 2018, EVs were 1% of all vehicles. Hawaiian Electric filed a road map with the state.

Oahu 

HEI's total firm generating capability in 2020 was 1,794.5 megawatts serving 304,261 customers. Non-firm capacity was 777.8 megawatts. 25.2% comes from renewable resources.

Maui/Lanai/Molokai 
Total firm generating capability in 2020 was 274.1 megawatts serving 72,522 customers. Non-firm capacity was 192.1 mw. 40.8% came from renewable resources.

Hawaii 
Total firm generating capability 213.4 megawatts serving 86,576 customers. Non-firm capacity was 147.6 mw. 34.7% came from renewable resources.

Electric vehicles
Through a cooperative effort with HECO, High Technology Development Corporation (HTDC), an agency of the State of Hawai’i, initiated the Hawai’i Electric Vehicle Demonstration Project (HEVDP) consortium to develop an electric vehicle industry in Hawai’i. The islands had about 5,000 rechargeable vehicles as of 2017.

Plans
In 2015, the Hawaii State Legislature amended the State's Renewable Portfolio Standards to establish the nation's first goal of 100% renewable energy:

Hawaiian Electric has indicated in its Power Supply Improvement Plan that it will achieve these goals ahead of schedule. From 2021, HEI transitioned away from cost of service to Performance Based Regulation.

See also

 Energy in Hawaii
 Wind power in Hawaii
 Solar power in Hawaii

References

External links
 Official Page of HEI
 Profile from Hoover's
 Profile from Platts

Companies listed on the New York Stock Exchange
Electric power companies of the United States
Companies based in Honolulu
1891 establishments in Hawaii
Energy companies established in 1891
Business in Hawaii